Pseudorhabdosynochus summanae is a species of diplectanid monogenean parasitic on the gills of the grouper Epinephelus summana. It was described in 1969, from only four specimens, under the name Diplectanum summanae  and transferred to the genus Pseudorhabdosynochus in 1986.

Description 

Pseudorhabdosynochus summanae is a small monogenean, 0.3-0.5 mm in length. The species has the general characteristics of other species of Pseudorhabdosynochus, with a flat body and a posterior haptor, which is the organ by which the monogenean attaches itself to the gill of is host. The haptor bears two squamodiscs, one ventral and one dorsal.
The sclerotized male copulatory organ, or "quadriloculate organ", has the shape of a bean with four internal chambers, as in other species of Pseudorhabdosynochus.
The vagina includes a sclerotized part, which is a complex structure.

Etymology
The specific epithet of the species, summanae, is not clearly explained in the original publication, but obviously refers to the name of the host fish, Epinephelus summana.

Hosts and localities

The type-locality is off Heron Island, Queensland, Australia and the type-host is Epinephelus summana.

References

External links 

Diplectanidae
Animals described in 1969
Platyhelminthes of Australia